Go Go Smear the Poison Ivy is the fourth studio album by múm. It was released via FatCat Records on 24 September 2007. It peaked at number 8 on Billboards Top Dance/Electronic Albums chart.

The album marks a shift from the group's original style as it uses more live instruments than electronics, and there is a different vocal style, including male vocals. Almost two years prior to the release of this album, former lead singer of múm, Kristín Anna Valtýsdóttir, departed from the band. According to reviews this is believed to be one reason for the break of style compared to earlier releases.

Track listing

Personnel
Additional musicians
 Samuli Kosminen – drums (on 1, 3, 4, 7, and 12)
 Eiríkur Orri Ólafsson – trumpet (on 8 and 10)
 Guðbjörg Hlin Guðmundsdóttir – violin
 Þórarinn MárBaldursson – viola
 Laufey Jensdóttir – violin
 Gyða Valtýsdóttir – cello
 Páll Ivan Pálsson – double bass
 Gunnhildur Einarsdóttir – harp

Charts

References

External links
 

2007 albums
Múm albums
FatCat Records albums